Iolaus maesa, the chocolate-bordered sapphire, is a butterfly in the family Lycaenidae. It is found in northern Guinea, Sierra Leone, Ivory Coast, Ghana, Togo, Nigeria (south and the Cross River loop), Cameroon, the Republic of the Congo, the Democratic Republic of the Congo (Tshopo) and Uganda. The habitat consists of forests.

The larvae feed on the flowers of Loranthus incanus.

References

External links

Die Gross-Schmetterlinge der Erde 13: Die Afrikanischen Tagfalter. Plate XIII 67 f

Butterflies described in 1862
Iolaus (butterfly)